NGC 5861 is an intermediate spiral galaxy in constellation Libra. It is located at a distance of circa 85 million light years from Earth, which, given its apparent dimensions, means that NGC 5861 is about 80,000 light years across.

The galaxy features two long spiral arms that dominate the optical disk. The one arm can be traced from its beginning at the center for nearly one and a half revolutions without branching, whereas the other starts to form fragments after one revolution, forming a moderately chaotic pattern. The galaxy hosts a hydroxyl megamaser.

Two supernovae have been observed in NGC 5861: SN 1971D and SN 2017erp. Observations by Hubble Space Telescope indicate that possibly there is a light echo created by SN 1971D.

NGC 5861 is the foremost member of a small galaxy group that also includes NGC 5858, which lies 9.6 arcmin north, forming a non-interactive pair. It is located within the same galaxy cloud with NGC 5878.

References

External links 
 

Barred spiral galaxies
Libra (constellation)
5861
54097